Morning Story is a British film made by BBC Television in 1969 and first broadcast in January 1970, directed by Gareth Davies and starring Lee Montague.

Outline
A door-to-door salesman finds a young girl playing in the street, which leads him into unexpected adventures.

Cast
Lee Montague as Danny Robbins
Hilary Mason as Mrs. McIsaac
Stephanie Turner as Mrs. Woolford
Bella Emberg as Mrs. Shaw
Alex Marshall as Mrs. Allan
Gilly Flower as Mrs. Johnson
Heather Canning as Mrs. Valentine 
Ann Mitchell as Mrs. Harris
Jo Richardson as Mrs. Lloyd
Sue Walker as Mrs. Vernon
Pamela Miles Mrs. Blackett
Edna Landor as Mrs. Davis
Jill Brooke as Mrs. Robertson 
Jumoke Debayo as Mrs. Harvey
Kathleen St. John as Mrs. Helsby
Kathleen Heath as Mrs. Cartwright 
Maggie Petersen as Mrs. Evans
Sylvia Burrows as Mrs. Hanks
Patti Dalton as Mrs. Carey
Janet Whiteside as Mrs. Fennimore

Notes

External links

1970 television films
1970 films
British drama films
BBC television dramas
1970s British films